Laval un Partneri Ltd v Svenska Byggnadsarbetareförbundet (2007) C-341/05 is an EU law case, relevant to all labour law within the European Union, which held that there is a positive right to strike. However, it also held that the right to strike must be exercised proportionately and in particular this right was subject to justification where it could infringe the right to freedom to provide services under the Treaty on the Functioning of the European Union article 56 (ex TEC article 49).

Laval was shortly preceded by another case involving the right to strike on freedom of establishment The Rosella, and by the influential European Court of Human Rights decision in Demir and Baykara v Turkey. It was soon implicitly reversed by the Rome I Regulation, recital 35, which states that in terms of conflicts of laws, mandatory rules for employees "can only be derogated from to their benefit."

Facts
A Latvian company, Laval un Partneri Ltd won a contract from the Swedish government to renovate schools. Laval Ltd posted Latvian workers to Sweden to work on site. These workers earned much less than comparable Swedish workers. The Swedish Building Workers' Union (Svenska Byggnadsarbetareförbundet) asked Laval Ltd to sign its collective agreement. This collective agreement would have been more favourable than the terms required to protect posted workers under the Posted Workers Directive, and also contained a clause for setting pay that would not allow Laval Ltd to determine in advance what the pay would be. Laval Ltd refused to sign the collective agreement. The Swedish Builders Union, supported by the Electricians Union called a strike to blockade Laval Ltd's building sites. As a result, Laval Ltd could not do business in Sweden. It claimed that the blockade infringed its right to free movement of services under TEC article 49 (now TFEU article 56). The Swedish court referred the matter to the ECJ.

Judgment
The ECJ held that, following ITWF v Viking Lines ABP (The Rosella), the "right to take collective action for the protection of the workers of the host state against possible social dumping may constitute an overriding reason of public interest" which could justify an infringement of free movement of services. However, in this case, it did not, because the systems for Sweden's collective bargaining was felt to be not "sufficiently precise and accessible" for the company to know its obligations in advance.

Significance
The case was roundly condemned by labour and human rights lawyers throughout the European Union. After the onset of the 2008 economic crisis, in the 2009 Lindsey Oil Refinery strikes, the issue of posted workers triggered a significant amount of unrest, with police equipping themselves with riot gear in response to wildcat strikes over posted workers in the United Kingdom.

In Sweden, the Labour Court sentenced the two trade unions to pay 550,000 Swedish kronor (€65,700) in so-called general damages plus interest and legal costs to Laval’s bankruptcy estate. The International Labour Organization’s Committee of Experts every year investigates member countries’ reports on how they implement the ILO’s conventions, in this case convention 87 on the freedom of association and protection of the right to organise. In 2013 the Committee of Experts criticised the changes made in Sweden after the EU Court of Justice ruling. According to the ILO the changes constituted a severe breach of the freedom of association.

See also

 The Rosella [2008] IRLR 143 (C-438/05), on freedom of establishment
 Demir and Baykara v Turkey (2009) 48 EHRR 54
Commission v Luxembourg (2008) C-319/06
Commission v Germany (2007) C-490/04, [2007] ECR I-6095
Rüffert v Land Niedersachsen (2008) C-346/06, [2008] ECR I-1989

Notes

References
A Dashwood, 'Viking and Laval: Issues of Horizontal Direct Effect' (2008) 10 Cambridge Yearbook of European Legal Studies 525
S Deakin, 'Regulatory Competition after Laval' (2008) 10 Cambridge Yearbook of European Legal Studies 581
C Barnard, 'Social Dumping or Dumping Socialism?' (2008) 67 CLJ 262
C Barnard, 'The UK and Posted Workers: The Effect of Commission v Luxembourg on the Territorial Application of British Labour Law' (2009) 38 ILJ 122
E McGaughey, A Casebook on Labour Law (Hart 2018) ch 10, 445

2007 in case law
Swedish case law
2007 in the European Union
Latvia–Sweden relations
European Union labour case law